Thirteen United States presidents have made presidential visits to Western Europe. The first visits by an incumbent president to countries in Western Europe were made in 1918 and 19 by Woodrow Wilson in the aftermath of World War I. He was awarded the 1919 Nobel Peace Prize for his peacemaking efforts.  Visits occurring during the 1940s through 1980s were offshoots of American diplomatic interactions following World War II and during the Cold War. To date, 40 visits have been made to France, 31 to Germany (including 10 specifically to West Germany or West Berlin), 21 to Belgium, 11 to Switzerland, six to Austria, and five to the Netherlands. No president has yet visited Liechtenstein, Luxembourg or Monaco.

Table of visits

Visits by former presidents
 Ulysses S. Grant visited France and the Netherlands in 1877, during a post-presidency world tour.
 Jimmy Carter, along with Carter Center personnel, met with the minister of foreign assistance in the Netherlands, and also with potential private corporate donors in The Hague, Netherlands, in September 1999, prior to visiting Bamako, Mali, for an assessment of the Center's health and agriculture programs in Africa.
 Bill Clinton visited the Netherlands in 2007 and 2011 for speaking engagements.

See also
 Foreign policy of the United States

Notes

References

Austria–United States relations
Belgium–United States relations
France–United States relations
Germany–United States relations
Liechtenstein–United States relations
Luxembourg–United States relations
Monaco–United States relations
Netherlands–United States relations
Switzerland–United States relations
Lists of United States presidential visits